The Canoe Sprint European Championships (or European Canoe Sprint Championships) is an international canoeing and kayaking event organized by the European Canoe Association (ECA). It was first held in 1933 in Prague under the auspices of the International Canoe Federation. In 1997, the European Championships were resumed, and now take place annually.

The most titled athlete of the European Championships is Hungarian Katalin Kovács, who has 29 gold medals, 17 silver medals and 2 bronze medals in her record. Among men, the number of wins is led by German Ronald Rauhe, who won the European championships 17 times.

Summary

Paracanoe only, since Canoe Sprint was included in the European Games.

Source:

Notes 
 The 1963 world championships were designated that year's European championships.
 The ECA chose not to organise the 2019 championships because of the European Games, so a separate Paracanoe European Championships were held as a result.
 The 2020 championships were cancelled due to the COVID-19 pandemic.
 Paracanoe added to the 2010 championships, then subsequent championships from 2013 onwards: http://www.europecanoeevents.com/events/results
 Results from 1933 to 1969: http://www.canoeresults.eu/view-results/sprint

European Junior & U23 Canoe Sprint Championships

Medal table

Canoe (1933 - 2022) 
The following table lists all the medals won by each nation since the 1933 edition. Exhibition events are not included in this ranking.

Para Canoe  (2017 - 2022) 
3 events in 2019 Paracanoe European Championships and 1 event (Men's VL1) from the 2022 Canoe Sprint European Championships are not included in the medal table due to lack of participation.

Most successful athletes
This following table lists athletes that have won multiple medals since the 1997 edition (updated until 2021).

See also 
International Canoe Federation
ICF Canoe Sprint World Championships
European Canoe Slalom Championships
European Canoe Marathon Championships

References

External links
 European Canoe Association

 
Canoeing and kayaking competitions in Europe
Recurring sporting events established in 1933
1933 establishments in Europe
European